Olympia Film Society (OFS) is a nonprofit arts organization in Olympia, Washington that shows independent, international and classic film year-round, offers special live performances, and produces the Olympia Film Festival. OFS welcomes its members and non-member patrons to the Capitol Theater.

Marked by steady growth in members, volunteers, and regular film screenings, OFS grew from a handful of film lovers chipping in to rent films once a month to an organization with over 2000 members.

Timeline
1980: OFS forms when a dozen people gather to at the old Washington School on Legion Way to watch the first show, "The 39 Steps" and "Foreign Correspondent," a double-feature tribute to Alfred Hitchcock.
1981: OFS moves to [Capitol City Studios and purchases 16-millimeter projector.
1984: The Olympia Film Festival is born, taking place at the State Theater. OFS membership jumps from 60 to 600.
1986: OFS starts showing films at the Capitol Theater, built in 1924. To accompany the silent classic "Pandora's Box," Timothy Brock conducts the Olympia Chamber Orchestra's world premiere of his original score.
1988: OFS takes on its first major capital expenditure to buy a new 35mm projection system.
1990: OFS finds a home in the Capitol Theater, signing the lease in time for the November Film Festival. ArtsWalk, Olympia's biannual downtown arts festival, is born this year to coincide with the opening of the Olympia Film Festival.
1992: The Northwest Premiere of Disney's Aladdin brings the Olympia Film Festival unprecedented attention.
1993: The production wing of the Olympia Film Society, the Olympia Film Ranch, is founded. The Film Ranch begins providing workshops and equipment rental to OFS members.
1997: Opening night of the OFF14 introduces the first phase of our new Dolby sound system, twelve new JBL surround speakers and a Dolby CP 500 cinema processor. Guests include world-renowned animators The Brothers Quay and cinematographer Michael Spiller.
1998: The After Quartet packs the Capitol Theater with their rousing score to Fritz Lang's's Metropolis. OFF15 brings producer Ted Hope, opening night filmmaker Hilary Brougher and film scholar Ray Carney.
1999: The Capitol Theater goes digital, thanks to a generous upgrade in our sound system courtesy of Dolby Digital. OFF16 urges Rick Schmidt (author, Feature Filmmaking at Used Car Prices) to dust off his old 16 mm prints for a retrospective that was a favorite with audiences. San Francisco's Sprocket Ensemble performs a feature-length program of their live scores to short contemporary animation. A new print of Orson Welles' The Trial closes our best festival yet.
2000: Ray Carney returns to present a retrospective of the films of Robert Bresson. OFF17 presents its most comprehensive series of panel discussions and guest seminars. All Freakin' Night breaks the previous records of attendance and bad taste for our classic all-night horror film marathon.
2001: OFS and the Capitol Theater survive a 6.8 earthquake and resume operations after six weeks of repairs. With a completed Dolby system and extensive renovations, OFF18 kicks off with a pre-festival screening of Mulholland Drive ends with a sold out screening of Amélie.
2002: OFS acquires our very own video projector, broadening opportunities for media exhibition. The OFF19 welcomes underground legends the Kuchar Brothers (John Waters' self-proclaimed single biggest inspiration) for a career retrospective. Bob and David from Mr. Show host a once-in-a-lifetime presentation of one of their guilty pleasures. The fest closes with a crowd pleasing screening of Real Women Have Curves.
October 2005: The Regal Foundation offered to hold a one-day fund raiser for the Olympia Film Society, prior to the Grand Opening of their Martin Village (Lacey) Regal Cinemas. All $1.00 ticket sales and $1.00 popcorn and soda sales were donated to OFS to the tune of $22,966.89.
January 2008: The Capitol Theater marquee, a 1940 addition, is removed.  Stained glass muses are revealed.

External links
Olympia Film Society website
Olympia Film Festival website

Film organizations in the United States
Culture of Olympia, Washington